The 2019 South Tyneside Council election took place on 2 May 2019 in concert with other local elections. Its purpose was to elect members of the South Tyneside Council in Tyne and Wear, North East England.

Ward results

Beacon & Bents

Bede

Biddick & All Saints

Boldon Colliery

Cleadon & East Boldon

Cleadon Park

Fellgate & Hedworth

Harton

Hebburn North

Hebburn South

Horsley Hill

Monkton

Primrose

Simonside & Rekendyke

West Park

Westoe

Whitburn & Marsden

Whiteleas

References

2019 English local elections
2019
21st century in Tyne and Wear